Astroblepus latidens is a species of catfish of the family Astroblepidae. It can be found on the Meta River in Colombia and Venezuela.

References

Bibliography
 Eschmeyer, William N., ed. 1998. Catalog of Fishes. Special Publication of the Center for Biodiversity Research and Information, num. 1, vol. 1–3. California Academy of Sciences. San Francisco, California, United States. 2905. .

Astroblepus
Fish described in 1918
Freshwater fish of Colombia
Fish of Venezuela